Verrucaria nodosa is a species of saxicolous (rock-dwelling), crustose lichen in the family Verrucariaceae. Found in freshwater habitats in Wales, it was formally described as a new species in 2013 by lichenologist Alan Orange. The type specimen was collected by the author north-west of Llanuwchllyn, Merioneth, where it was found growing on an unshaded rock in a stream. The lichen has a grey-green to dark brown thallus with an uneven surface crust. Its ascomata are in the form of somewhat convex to hemispherical  measuring 220–460 μm in diameter, with an inconspicuous or tiny ostiole. Ascospores are ellipsoid and colourless, lack any septa, and typically measure 20.5–22.2–24.0 by 90–97–105 μm. The species is known only from a few streams in Wales, where it grows on shaded or lightly shaded rocks. Associated lichen species include Ionaspis lacustris, Rhizocarpon lavatum, Porpidia hydrophila, Sporodictyon cruentum, and Trapelia coarctata, as well as the mosses Racomitrium aciculare and Scapania undulata.

See also
List of Verrucaria species

References

nodosa
Lichen species
Lichens described in 2013
Lichens of Northern Europe
Taxa named by Alan Orange